Guinea made its Paralympic Games début at the 2004 Summer Paralympics in Athens, sending a single representative (Ahmed Barry) to compete in athletics. He took part in two events, and did not win a medal. Barry was, again, Guinea's sole representative at the 2008 Summer Paralympics in Beijing. Entering only one race on that occasion, he was a non-starter. He remains the only person to have represented Guinea at the Paralympic Games.

Guinea has never taken part in the Winter Paralympics.

Full results for Guinea at the Paralympics

See also
 Guinea at the Olympics

References